The 27th ceremony of the Forqué Awards was held on 11 December 2021 at the IFEMA Palacio Municipal in Madrid. The gala, aired on RTVE Play, was hosted by Elena S. Sánchez and Marta Hazas.

History 
The nominations were disclosed on 11 November 2021.

The ceremony, organised by the association of producers EGEDA, had the participation of the Ayuntamiento de Madrid, the Community of Madrid and RTVE, the collaboration of the Spanish Ministry of Culture and Sport and the sponsoring of  Centro Comercial Príncipe Pío, CINESA, Cornejo, FIPCA and Mercedes-Benz. 

The gala, which paid homage to the 1980s, featured musical performances by the likes of Alaska, Ana Guerra, Burning, Danza Invisible, La Frontera, La Guardia, Los Secretos, Los Trogloditas, Mikel Erentxun, Modestia Aparte or Tennessee. It was hosted by Elena S. Sánchez and Marta Hazas.

The chairman of EGEDA, Enrique Cerezo, gifted the Gold Medal recognizing a career in the audiovisual industry to producer .

Winners and nominees
The winners and nominees are listed as follows:

References

External links 
 Gala of the 27th Forqué Awards on RTVE Play

Forqué Awards
2021 film awards
2021 television awards
2021 in Madrid
RTVE Play original programming
December 2021 events in Spain